Birla may refer to:
 Birla family
 Members of the Birla family:
 Aditya Vikram Birla
 Ananya Birla
 Basant Kumar Birla
 G. D. Birla
 K. K. Birla
 C. K. Birla
 Kumar Mangalam Birla

See also
 Burla (disambiguation)

Birla family